Donsö IS is a Swedish football club located in Donsö.

Background
Donsö IS currently plays in Division 4 Göteborg B which is the sixth tier of Swedish football. They play their home matches at the Donsövallen in Donsö.

The club is affiliated to Göteborgs Fotbollförbund. Donsö IS have competed in the Svenska Cupen on 1 occasion and have played 3 matches in the competition.

Season to season

References

External links
 Donsö IS – Official website
 Donsö IS on Facebook

Football clubs in Gothenburg
Football clubs in Västra Götaland County